Limoux-Flassian is a railway station in Limoux, Occitanie, France. The station is on the Carcassonne–Rivesaltes line. The station is served by TER (local) services operated by the SNCF. The station is just a single platform with a shelter, tickets need to be purchased on the train.

Train services
The following services currently call at Limoux-Flassian:
local service (TER Occitanie) Carcassonne–Limoux

References

Railway stations in France opened in 1985
Railway stations in Aude